Richard Mauze Burr (born November 30, 1955) is an American businessman and politician who served as a United States senator from North Carolina from 2005 to 2023. A member of the Republican Party, Burr was previously a member of the United States House of Representatives.

Born in Charlottesville, Virginia, Burr is a graduate of Wake Forest University. Before seeking elected office, he was a sales manager for a lawn equipment company. In 1994, he was elected to the U.S. House of Representatives for North Carolina's 5th congressional district as part of the Republican Revolution.

Burr was first elected to the United States Senate in 2004. From 2015 to 2020, he chaired the Senate Intelligence Committee. In 2016, he announced that he would not seek reelection in 2022. Burr temporarily stepped down as chair of the Intelligence Committee on May 15, 2020, amid an FBI investigation into allegations of insider trading during the COVID-19 pandemic. On January 19, 2021, the Department of Justice announced that the investigation had been closed, with no charges against Burr.

Burr was one of seven Republican senators to vote to convict Donald Trump of incitement of insurrection in his second impeachment trial.

Early life, education, and business career
Burr was born on November 30, 1955, in Charlottesville, Virginia, the son of Martha (Gillum) and Rev. David Horace White Burr. He graduated from Richard J. Reynolds High School in Winston-Salem, North Carolina, in 1974 and earned a B.A. in communications from Wake Forest University in 1978. In college, Burr played defensive back for the Wake Forest Demon Deacons football team. He is a member of the Kappa Sigma fraternity.

Before running for Congress, Burr worked for 17 years as a sales manager for Carswell Distributing Company, a distributor of lawn equipment. He is a member of the board of Brenner Children's Hospital and the West Point Board of Visitors.

U.S. House of Representatives
In 1992, Burr ran against incumbent Representative Stephen L. Neal for the seat in the Winston-Salem-based 5th District and lost. He ran again in 1994 after Neal chose not to seek reelection, and was elected in a landslide year for Republicans.

In the House, Burr authored the FDA Modernization Act of 1997. He also helped create the National Institute for Biomedical Imaging and Bioengineering. In the aftermath of the 9/11 attacks, he successfully sponsored amendments to improve defenses against bioterrorism.

As a representative, Burr co-sponsored, with Senator Kit Bond, an amendment to the Energy Policy Act of 2003 relaxing restrictions on the export of specific types of enriched uranium that were first enacted in the Schumer Amendment to the Energy Policy Act of 1992. The original Schumer amendment placed increased controls on U.S. civilian exports of weapons-grade highly enriched uranium (HEU) to encourage foreign users to switch to reactor-grade low-enriched uranium (LEU) for isotope production. HEU is attractive to terrorists because it can be used to create a simple nuclear weapon, while LEU cannot be used directly to make nuclear weapons. Burr's amendment allowed exports of HEU to five countries for creating medical isotopes.

Burr was reelected four times with no substantial opposition. He never received less than 62% of the vote, and ran unopposed in 2002.

United States Senate

Elections

2004

In July 2004, Burr won the Republican primary to seek the U.S. Senate seat being vacated by John Edwards, who had retired from the Senate to run for vice president with presidential nominee John Kerry in the 2004 election, which they lost to incumbent president George W. Bush. He faced Democratic Party nominee Erskine Bowles and Libertarian Tom Bailey. Burr won the election by five percentage points.

2010

Burr defeated the Democratic nominee, North Carolina Secretary of State Elaine Marshall, with 55% of the vote. He is the first Republican since Jesse Helms to be reelected to the United States Senate from North Carolina. He also broke the "curse" that his seat held, being the first senator reelected to the seat since 1968 (when Sam Ervin won his final term).

2016

Burr defeated Democratic nominee Deborah K. Ross, 51%–45%. Burr was an advisor for Donald Trump's presidential campaign.

2022

On July 20, 2016, during his reelection campaign, Burr announced that, should he win that year's election (which he did), he would not seek reelection to a fourth term in 2022.

Tenure and political positions

In 2007, Burr ran for chair of the Senate Republican Conference, but lost to Senator Lamar Alexander of Tennessee by a vote of 31 to 16. In 2009, Senator Jon Kyl of Arizona, the Senate Republican Whip, appointed Burr Chief Deputy Whip in the 111th Congress. In 2007, Burr was named a deputy whip. In 2011, he announced his intention to seek the post of minority whip, the number two Republican position in the Senate, but he dropped out of that race in 2012.

As of March 2020, Burr had voted with Trump about 92.2% of the time. He rarely votes against the majority of his party (in about 1.5% of votes). The American Conservative Union's Center for Legislative Accountability gives Burr a lifetime rating of 86.

Campaign finance 
Burr opposes the DISCLOSE Act, which would require political ads include information about who funded the ad. He supports the U.S. Supreme Court decision Citizens United, which allowed political action committees to spend an unlimited amount of money during elections so long as they were not in direct coordination with candidates.

Economy
Burr has been critical of financial regulations; he strongly opposed, and voted against, the Dodd–Frank Wall Street Reform and Consumer Protection Act of 2010 and the creation of the Consumer Financial Protection Bureau. In 2018, he voted for legislation that partly repealed the Dodd–Frank reforms.

In fall 2008, during the global financial crisis, Burr said he was going to an ATM every day and taking out cash because he thought the financial system would soon collapse. In 2009, in response to press about his experience, Burr said that he would do the same thing again next time.

Burr is a signatory of the Taxpayer Protection Pledge, a pledge vowing to oppose to tax increases for any reason. He opposes raising taxes on businesses or high-income people to fund public services.

In 2013, Burr criticized Senator Ted Cruz and other Republican colleagues for filibustering the passage of the fiscal year 2014 federal budget (thereby precipitating a federal government shutdown) in an effort to defund the Affordable Care Act. Burr called the approach of Cruz and allies "the height of hypocrisy" and the "dumbest idea I've ever heard."

Burr opposed ratification of the Trans-Pacific Partnership (TPP) and supported the adoption of the United States–Mexico–Canada Agreement.

In March 2015, Burr voted for an amendment to establish a deficit-neutral reserve fund to allow employees to earn paid sick time. He opposes raising the federal minimum wage.

In 2016, Burr said he supports the privatization of Social Security.

Environment and climate change

Burr was one of 20 senators to vote against the Omnibus Public Land Management Act of 2009, a public land management and conservation bill. He supported renewal of the 1965 Land and Water Conservation Fund.

Burr does not accept the scientific consensus on climate change; he acknowledges that climate change is occurring, but has expressed doubt that it is caused by human activity. He opposes regulations to limit greenhouse gas emissions, and opposed federal grants or subsidies to encourage the productions of renewable energy. In 2015, he voted against a measure to declare that climate change is real, human-caused, creating problems, and that the U.S. must shift from fossil fuels to sustainable energy. In 2013, Burr voted for a measure expressing opposition to a federal tax or fee on carbon emissions. He voted in favor of the Keystone XL pipeline.

In 2017, Burr voted to repeal the Stream Protection Rule as well as rules requiring energy companies to reduce waste, reduce emissions, and disclose payments from foreign governments. In 2019, he voted to repeal an Environmental Protection Agency (EPA) rule regarding emissions. He has supported the lowering of federal taxes on alternative fuels and the initiation of a hydropower project on the Yadkin River in Wilkes County, North Carolina. In 2011, Burr voted to abolish the EPA and merge it with the U.S. Department of Energy.

In 2019, Burr was one of nine Republican lawmakers to found the Roosevelt Conservation Caucus, a conservation-focused group of Republican members of Congress.

Education 
In 2017, Burr voted to confirm Betsy DeVos as U.S. education secretary; she was confirmed by 51–50, with Vice President Mike Pence casting a tie-breaking vote after the Senate deadlocked. DeVos's family donated $43,200 to Burr's reelection campaign against Democrat Deborah Ross. Burr typically votes against any increased funding for federal education projects, and in 2016 said he opposed increasing Pell Grants, other forms of student financial aid, and any new subsidies that would help students refinance their loans. He supports the goals of charter schools and has voted to allow school prayer. He voted for the No Child Left Behind Act of 2001.

Foreign policy
Burr's foreign policy views have been described as hawkish at times. In 2002, he voted for the Authorization for Use of Military Force Against Iraq Resolution, which authorized the U.S. invasion of Iraq. Burr supported President Bush's troop surge in Iraq in January 2007, saying that the effort to counter the insurgency would increase "security and stability" in Iraq. In February 2019, he voted for a measure disapproving of the withdrawal of U.S. military forces from Afghanistan and Syria. In February 2020, Burr voted against a measure restricting Trump from initiating military action against Iran without Congressional approval.

In 2017, Burr co-sponsored the Israel Anti-Boycott Act (s. 720), which would make it a federal crime for Americans to encourage or participate in boycotts against Israel and Israeli settlements in the West Bank if protesting actions by the Israeli government.

In 2018 and 2019, Burr opposed legislation to prohibit U.S. arms sales to Saudi Arabia and the United Arab Emirates, and to end U.S. military assistance to the Saudi Arabian-led intervention in Yemen.

Gun policy
Burr has a perfect score from the National Rifle Association for NRA-supported legislation, and the NRA has extensively supported Burr's campaigns. In the 2016 election, the NRA spent nearly $7 million to support Burr against his Democratic rival Deborah K. Ross; over his career, Burr received more help from the NRA than all but one other member of Congress. Burr used the same media consultant as the NRA for ads.

In 2013, Burr voted against gun control measures, including extended background checks to internet and gun show weapons purchases and an assault weapons ban. He sponsored legislation to stop the U.S. Department of Veterans Affairs from adding the names of veterans to the National Instant Criminal Background Check System (NICS) if the department has assigned a financial fiduciary to take care of their finances due to mental incompetence, unless a judge or magistrate deems them to be a danger. People added to the NICS system are barred from purchasing or owning a firearm. Burr voted against Senator Dianne Feinstein's "no fly no buy" bill, but supported a Republican alternative measure by Senator John Cornyn that "proposed a 72-hour delay on gun sales to people whose names have been on a federal terror watch list within the past five years."

Speaking privately on the topic of guns to a group of Republican volunteers in Mooresville, North Carolina, Burr joked that a magazine cover of Hillary Clinton ought to have had a bullseye on it. He quickly apologized for the comment.

In 2022, Burr later became one of ten Republican Senators to support a bipartisan agreement on gun control, which involved a red flag provision, a support for state crisis intervention orders, funding for school safety resources, stronger background checks for buyers under the age of 21, and penalties for straw purchases.

Health policy
Burr voted against the Patient Protection and Affordable Care Act (ACA) in December 2009, and against the Health Care and Education Reconciliation Act of 2010. In 2014, Burr and Senator Orrin Hatch sponsored the Patient Choice, Affordability, Responsibility and Empowerment Act, a bill that would repeal and replace the ACA. In 2017, Burr voted for the Republican legislation to replace major parts of the ACA; the legislation failed in the Senate on a 50–49 vote.

In 2012, Burr co-sponsored a plan to overhaul Medicare; his bill would have raised the eligibility age from 65 to 67 over time and shifted more seniors to private insurance. The proposal would have begun "a transition to a system dominated by private insurance plans."

Burr opposed legislation to allow the U.S. Food and Drug Administration (FDA) to regulate the tobacco industry, which is economically important in North Carolina, and unsuccessfully tried to filibuster the Family Smoking Prevention and Tobacco Control Act of 2009. In 2010, he introduced the National Uniformity for Food Act, unsuccessful legislation that would have banned states from forcing manufacturers to include labels other than those required by the FDA on consumables and health and beauty products.

Social issues
In 2018, Burr voted in favor of legislation to ban abortion after 20 weeks of pregnancy. He supports parental notification laws and efforts to restrict federal funding of Planned Parenthood. He voted to define a pregnancy as carrying an "unborn child" from the moment of conception. He voted to prevent minors who have crossed state lines from getting an abortion, as well as to ensure parents are notified if their child does get an abortion. He voted to extend the federal prohibition on tax dollars being used for abortions by preventing the U.S. Department of Health and Human Services from giving grants to any organization that performs abortions at any of its locations.

Burr opposes the legalization of cannabis for both medical and recreational use. He stated that there should be greater enforcement of current anti-cannabis federal laws in all states, even when cannabis is legal as a matter of state law.

Burr voted for the Don't Ask, Don't Tell Repeal Act of 2010, the only Southern Republican senator to do so. The bill repealed the Defense Department's don't ask, don't tell policy of employment discrimination against openly gay individuals. Burr and John Ensign were the only senators who voted against cloture but for passage; Burr said he opposed taking up the issue of DADT repeal amid wars in Iraq and Afghanistan, but voted in favor of the bill anyway, becoming one of eight Republicans who backed the final repeal bill.

Burr supported a constitutional ban on same-sex marriage, but in 2013 said that he believed the law on same-sex marriage should be left to the states. In 2013, he voted against the Employment Non-Discrimination Act, a bill to extend federal employment discrimination protections to LGBT persons. In 2015, Burr was one of 11 Senate Republicans to vote in favor of allowing same-sex spouses to have access to federal Social Security and veterans' benefits.

Burr thinks that bathroom access should be regulated by sex listed on birth certificates, but has also sought to distance himself from H.B. 2, North Carolina's controversial "bathroom legislation."

Burr voted to reauthorize the Violence Against Women Act in 2013.

Burr voted against earmarking money to reduce teen pregnancy (via a requirement that health insurers have equitable birth control coverage, increased funding for family planning services, and funding for education programs that teaches vulnerable teens about contraceptives). He has stated he supports giving employers the right to restrict access to birth control coverage of employees if it is for moral reasons.

In December 2018, Burr was one of 12 Republican senators to vote against the cloture motion on the First Step Act, a criminal justice reform measure altering federal sentencing laws, but ultimately voted for the law.

Judiciary
In 2016, Burr and other Republican Senators opposed holding hearings on President Obama's nomination of Judge Merrick Garland to a vacancy on the Supreme Court of the United States, and refused to have a customary meeting with Garland. He said that if Hillary Clinton were elected president, he would try to block her from ever filling the vacancy, saying that if Clinton won, "I am going to do everything I can do to make sure four years from now, we still got an opening on the Supreme Court." Burr voted to confirm Trump's Supreme Court nominees Neil Gorsuch and Brett Kavanaugh, issuing a statement in favor of Kavanaugh's nomination two days before the testimony of Christine Blasey Ford, who accused Kavanaugh of sexually assaulting her while in high school, and indicating he would support Kavanaugh's confirmation regardless of the hearing.

In 2016, Burr blocked consideration of Patricia Timmons-Goodson's nomination to fill a vacancy on U.S. District Court for the Eastern District of North Carolina; Obama nominated Timmons-Goodson to fill the seat, which had been vacant for more than 11 years. He has expressed pride at creating the longest federal court bench vacancy in U.S. history by blocking the appointment of a judge Obama nominated.

Privacy and surveillance
Some provisions of the Patriot Act, including those enabling the bulk collection of metadata for private telephone records by the National Security Agency, were scheduled to expire at the end of May 2015. As chair of the Senate Intelligence Committee, Burr proposed extending the provisions for two years, but his amendments were defeated. After the provisions expired, the Senate passed the USA Freedom Act, which instead allowed the NSA to subpoena the data from telephone companies.

In 2016, following the FBI–Apple encryption dispute, Burr and Senator Dianne Feinstein circulated a draft bill (subsequently leaked) that would create a "backdoor" mandate, requiring technology companies to design encryption so as to provide law enforcement with user data in an "intelligible format" when required to do so by court order.

President Trump 
Burr was a national security adviser to the Trump campaign. He stated that Trump "aligns perfectly" with the Republican Party. When asked on the campaign trail about Trump's offensive remarks about women, Burr said Trump should be forgiven a few mistakes and given time to change.

In 2017, Burr said of Trump's firing of FBI Director James Comey, "I have found Director Comey to be a public servant of the highest order."

As chair of the United States Senate Select Committee on Intelligence, Burr led that chamber's investigation into Russian interference in the 2016 United States elections. In March 2017, Comey briefed congressional leaders and Intelligence Committee heads on the ongoing investigation into Russian interference in the election. That briefing included "an identification of the principal U.S. subjects of the investigation." The Mueller report found that Burr had then corresponded with the Trump White House a week later about the Russia probes, with the White House Counsel's office, led by Don McGahn, apparently receiving "information about the status of the FBI investigation."

In December 2019, amid an impeachment inquiry into Trump over the Trump-Ukraine scandal (Trump's request that Ukraine announce an investigation into his political rival Joe Biden), Burr pushed the debunked conspiracy theory that Ukraine meddled in the 2016 election. Burr said, "There's no difference in the way Russia put their feet, early on, on the scale—being for one candidate and everybody called it meddling—and how the Ukrainian officials did it." During Trump's first impeachment trial, Burr said he would oppose removing Trump from office even if a quid pro quo was confirmed. He opposed calling Trump's former National Security Adviser John Bolton as a witness at the Senate trial; Bolton had written that Trump had tied U.S. security aid to Ukraine to the country's taking action against Biden. Burr voted to acquit Trump on the two charges of obstruction of Congress and abuse of power.

On February 9, 2021, Burr voted against the constitutionality of the trial. Despite this, on February 13, 2021, Burr was one of seven Republicans to vote to convict in Trump's second impeachment trial. On February 16, the North Carolina Republican Party censured him for the vote.

Insider trading allegations

In early February 2020, just before the COVID-19 market crash, Burr sold more than $1.6 million of stock in 33 transactions during a period when, as head of the Senate Intelligence Committee, he was being briefed daily regarding potential health threats from COVID-19. He sold 95% of the holdings in his Individual Retirement Account (IRA). According to the FBI, Burr's sales six days before "a dramatic and substantial" downturn in the stock market allowed him to profit more than $164,000 and avoid $87,000 in losses. The stocks sold included several considered vulnerable to economic downturns, such as hotel chains. Burr's brother-in-law Gerald Fauth also subsequently sold stocks; according to the Securities and Exchange Commission, Burr had a 50-second phone conversation with Fauth in February 2020, immediately after which Fauth sold shares.

On March 19, before Burr's stock trades were publicly known, NPR reported Burr had warned a private organization in North Carolina on February 27 about the dangers of the virus, likely containment steps, and their extreme economic impacts on stocks and businesses, just two weeks after the stock sale. The advice contradicted his comments in a Fox News op-ed with Lamar Alexander on February 7. The organization he spoke to was Tar Heel Circle, a nonpartisan club of businesses and organizations that costs between $500 and $10,000 to join and assures members "enjoy interaction with top leaders and staff from Congress, the administration, and the private sector."

Later on March 19, the nonprofit investigative organization ProPublica broke news of Burr’s stock transactions. When asked for comment, a spokesperson first "express[ed] displeasure with NPR's earlier characterizations” of the February 27 Tar Heel Circle event, and later added, "As the situation continues to evolve daily, he has been deeply concerned by the steep and sudden toll this pandemic is taking on our economy." The Raleigh News & Observer editorial board criticized Burr's conduct: "Burr had a clear grasp of the danger ahead. Why did he only share it with a group whose member companies… contributed more than $100,000… to Burr’s last re-election campaign? Why didn’t Burr provide his assessment to all the constituents he is supposed to serve, as well as the national media?" Fox News pundit Tucker Carlson called for Burr's resignation in the face of the allegations.

The Department of Justice, in coordination with the Securities and Exchange Commission, launched a formal probe into the stock sales made during the early days of the coronavirus epidemic by several legislators, including Burr. Burr was also sued by a shareholder for alleged STOCK Act violations.

On May 13, the FBI served a search warrant on Burr at his Washington residence and seized his cellphone. He temporarily stepped down as chair of the Intelligence Committee the next day, taking effect on May 15.

On January 19, 2021, the Justice Department informed Burr that it would not pursue charges against him.

The FBI's search warrant affidavit was partially unsealed in September 2022, after litigation by the Los Angeles Times and the Reporters Committee for Freedom of the Press.  

Burr was one of only three senators to oppose the STOCK Act of 2012, which prohibits members of Congress and congressional staff from using nonpublic information in securities trading.

2021 storming of the United States Capitol
On May 28, 2021, Burr abstained from voting on the creation of an independent commission to investigate the January 6 United States Capitol attack.

Committee assignments 

 Committee on Finance
 Committee on Health, Education, Labor, and Pensions (Ranking)
 Subcommittee on Children and Families
 Subcommittee on Employment and Workplace Safety
 Subcommittee on Primary Health and Retirement Security
 Select Committee on Intelligence
 Special Committee on Aging

Caucus membership
 Congressional Boating Caucus (Co-Chair)
 International Conservation Caucus
 Sportsmen's Caucus
 Weapons of Mass Destruction Terrorism Caucus
Congressional NextGen 9-1-1 Caucus

Personal life 

Burr's car, a 1973 Volkswagen Thing, is "something of a local celebrity" on Capitol Hill. Burr has a known aversion to reporters, once even climbing out of his office window while carrying his dry cleaning to avoid them. Burr is a member of the United Methodist Church.

Burr has been married to Brooke Fauth Burr, a real estate agent, since 1984, and they have two sons, Tyler and William. Both work for tobacco companies. He is a distant relative of 19th century vice-president Aaron Burr, as a descendant of one of Aaron Burr’s brothers.

Post-Congressional Career

Upon leaving Congress, Burr took a job at law firm DLA Piper as a principal policy advisor and chair of the Health Policy Strategic Consulting Practice.

Electoral history

References

External links

 U.S. Senator Richard Burr official U.S. Senate website
 Burr campaign  website
 
 
 

|-

|-

|-

|-

|-

|-

|-

1955 births
20th-century Methodists
21st-century Methodists
21st-century American politicians
American United Methodists
Burr family
Living people
Politicians from Charlottesville, Virginia
Republican Party members of the United States House of Representatives from North Carolina
Republican Party United States senators from North Carolina
Wake Forest Demon Deacons football players
Wake Forest University alumni